The Chevron B38 was an open-wheel formula racing car, designed, developed and built by Chevron Cars, for both Formula Atlantic and Formula 3 racing, in 1977. This drove the rear wheels through a Hewland five-speed manual transmission. The chassis was constructed out of a lightweight aluminum monocoque.

References

Formula Three cars
1970s cars
Chevron racing cars